Neopterygii (from Greek νέος neos 'new' and πτέρυξ pteryx 'fin') is a subclass of ray-finned fish (Actinopterygii). Neopterygii includes the Holostei and the Teleostei, of which the latter comprise the vast majority of extant fishes, and over half of all living vertebrate species. While living holosteans include only freshwater taxa, teleosts are diverse in both freshwater and marine environments. Many new species of teleosts are scientifically described each year.

Fossil evidence for crown group neopterygians goes back at least 251 million years to the Induan stage of the Early Triassic epoch, however, one study incorporating morphological data from fossils and molecular data from nuclear and mitochondrial DNA, places this divergence date at least 284 mya (million years ago), during the Artinskian stage of the Early Permian. Another study suggests an even earlier split (360 myr ago, near the Devonian-Carboniferous boundary).

Evolution and diversity 

Living neopterygians are subdivided into two main groups (infraclasses): teleosts and holosteans. Holosteans comprise two clades, the Ginglymodi and the Halecomorphi. All of these groups have a long and extensive fossil record. The evolutionary relationships between the different groups of Neopterygii is summarized in the cladogram below (divergence time for each clade in mya are based on).

Neopterygians are a very speciose group. They make up over 50% of the total vertebrate diversity today, and their diversity grew since the Mesozoic era. However, the diversity of the various groups of neopterygians (or of fishes in general) is unevenly distributed, with teleosts making up the vast majority (96%) of living species.

Early in their evolution, neopterygians were a very successful group of fish, because they could move more rapidly than their ancestors. Their scales and skeletons began to lighten during their evolution, and their jaws became more powerful and efficient. While electroreception and the ampullae of Lorenzini are present in all other groups of fish, with the exception of hagfish (although hagfish are not actinopterygians, they are agnathans), neopterygians have lost this sense, even if it has later been re-evolved within Gymnotiformes and catfishes, which possess non-homologous teleost ampullae.

Only a few changes occurred during the evolution of neopterygians from the earlier actinopterygians. However, a very important step in the evolution of neopterygians is the acquisition of a better control of the movements of both dorsal and anal fins, resulting in an improvement in their swimming capabilities. They additionally acquired several modifications in the skull, which allowed the evolution of different feeding mechanisms and consequently the colonization of new ecological niches. All of these characters represented major improvements, resulting in Neopterygii becoming the dominant group of fishes (and, thus, taxonomically of vertebrates in general) today.

The great diversity of extant teleosts has been linked to a whole genome duplication event during their evolution.

Classification 

 Order †Pholidopleuriformes 
 Order †Redfieldiiformes 
 Order †Platysiagiformes 
 Order †Polzbergiiformes 
 Order †Perleidiformes 
 Order †Louwoichthyiformes
 Order †Peltopleuriformes 
 Order †Luganoiiformes
 Order †Pycnodontiformes 
 Infraclass Holostei
Clade Halecomorphi
Order †Parasemionotiformes 
Order †Panxianichthyiformes
Order †Ionoscopiformes
Order Amiiformes,  the bowfin
Clade Ginglymodi
Order †?Dapediiformes
Order Semionotiformes
Order Lepisosteiformes, the gars
Clade Teleosteomorpha
Order †Prohaleciteiformes
Order †Aspidorhynchiformes
Order Pachycormiformes
 Infraclass Teleostei
 Order †?Araripichthyiformes
 Order †?Ligulelliiformes 
 Order †?Tselfatiiformes 
 Order †Pholidophoriformes 
 Order †Dorsetichthyiformes
 Order †Leptolepidiformes
 Order †Crossognathiformes 
 Order †Ichthyodectiformes 
 Superorder Osteoglossomorpha
 Order †Lycopteriformes
Order Osteoglossiformes,  the bony-tongued fishes
 Order Hiodontiformes, including the mooneye and goldeye
 Superorder Elopomorpha
 Order Elopiformes, including the ladyfishes and tarpon
 Order Albuliformes, the bonefishes
 Order Notacanthiformes, including the halosaurs and spiny eels
 Order Anguilliformes, the true eels
 Order Saccopharyngiformes,  including the gulper eel
 Superorder Clupeomorpha
 Order †Ellimmichthyiformes
Order Clupeiformes, including herrings and anchovies
 Superorder Ostariophysi
 Order †Sorbininardiformes
Order Gonorynchiformes, including the milkfishes
 Order Cypriniformes, including barbs, carp, danios, goldfishes, loaches, minnows, rasboras
 Order Characiformes, including characins, pencilfishes, hatchetfishes, piranhas, tetras.
 Order Gymnotiformes, including electric eels and knifefishes
 Order Siluriformes, the catfishes
 Superorder Lepidogalaxii
Order Lepidogalaxiiformes, the salamanderfish
Superorder Protacanthopterygii
 Order Argentiniformes, including the barreleyes and slickheads (formerly in Osmeriformes)
 Order Salmoniformes, including salmon, Arctic char, and trout
 Order Esociformes, the pikes and mudminnows
Order Galaxiiformes, the galaxiids
 Order Osmeriformes, including the smelts
 Superorder Stenopterygii (may belong in Protacanthopterygii)
 Order Ateleopodiformes,  the jellynose fish
 Order Stomiiformes,  including the bristlemouths and marine hatchetfishes
 Superorder Cyclosquamata (may belong in Protacanthopterygii)
 Order Aulopiformes,  including the Bombay duck, tripod fish, and lancetfishes
 Superorder Scopelomorpha
 Order Myctophiformes,  including the lanternfishes
 Superorder Lampridiomorpha
 Order Lampriformes,  including the oarfish, opah and ribbonfishes
 Superorder Polymyxiomorpha
 Order †Pattersonichthyiformes
Order †Ctenothrissiformes
Order Polymixiiformes,  the beardfishes
 Superorder Paracanthopterygii
 Order Percopsiformes, including the cavefishes and trout-perches
Order †Sphenocephaliformes
 Order Batrachoidiformes,  the toadfishes
 Order Lophiiformes, including the anglerfishes
 Order Gadiformes, including cods
 Order Ophidiiformes, including the pearlfishes
 Superorder Acanthopterygii
 Order Mugiliformes, the mullets
 Order Atheriniformes, including silversides and rainbowfishes
 Order Beloniformes, including the flyingfishes
 Order Cetomimiformes, the whalefishes
 Order Cyprinodontiformes, including live-bearers, killifishes
 Order Stephanoberyciformes, including the ridgeheads
 Order Beryciformes, including the fangtooths and pineconefishes
 Order Zeiformes, including the dories
 Order Gobiesociformes, the clingfishes
 Order Gasterosteiformes including sticklebacks
 Order Syngnathiformes, including the seahorses and pipefishes
 Order Synbranchiformes, including the swamp eels
 Order Tetraodontiformes, including the sunfish, filefishes and pufferfish
 Order Pleuronectiformes, the flatfishes
 Order Scorpaeniformes, including scorpionfishes and the sculpins
 Order Perciformes 40% of all fish including anabantids, bass, cichlids, gobies, gouramis, mackerel, perches, scats, whiting, wrasses

References 

 
Lopingian first appearances
Extant Permian first appearances